The Soviet Union (USSR) competed at the 1968 Summer Olympics in Mexico City. 312 competitors, 246 men and 66 women, took part in 164 events in 18 sports.

Medalists
The USSR finished second in the final medal rankings, with 29 gold and 91 total medals.

Gold
Natalia Kuchinskaya — Artistic Gymnastics, Women's Balance Beam
Larisa Petrik — Artistic Gymnastics, Women's Floor Exercise
Mikhail Voronin — Artistic Gymnastics, Men's Horizontal Bar
Natalia Kuchinskaya, Zinaida Voronina, Larisa Petrik, Olga Karaseva, Ludmilla Tourischeva, Lyubov Burda — Artistic Gymnastics, Women's Team Competition
Mikhail Voronin — Artistic Gymnastics, Men's Vault
Vladimir Golubnichy — Athletics, Men's 20 km Walk
Yanis Lusis — Athletics, Men's Javelin Throw
Viktor Saneev — Athletics, Men's triple jump
Valeri Sokolov — Boxing, Men's Bantamweight
Boris Lagutin — Boxing, Men's Light-middleweight
Daniel Poznyak — Boxing, Men's Light-heavyweight
Lyudmila Khvedosyuk-Pinaeva — Canoeing, Women's K-1 500m
Aleksandr Sharapenko, Vladimir Morozov — Canoeing, Men's K-2 1000m
Ivan Kizimov, his horse Ijor — Equestrian, Individual Mixed
Elena Novikova-Belova — Fencing, Women's Foil Individual
Aleksandra Zabelina, Tatyana Petrenko-Samusenko, Elena Novikova-Belova, Galina Gorokhova, Svetlana Tširkova — Fencing, Women's Foil Team
Vladimir Nazlymov, Viktor Sidyak, Eduard Vinokurov, Mark Rakita, Umar Mavlikhanov — Fencing, Men's Sabre Team
Anatoli Sass, Aleksandr Timoshinin — Rowing, Men's Double Sculls
Valentyn Mankin — Sailing, Men's Finn
Grigory Kosykh — Shooting, Men's 50m Pistol
Evgeni Petrov — Shooting, Men's Skeet
Eduard Sibiryakov, Valeri Kravchenko, Vladimir Belyaev, Yevgeni Lapinsky, Oleg Antropov, Vasilius Matushevas, Viktor Mikhalchuk, Yuri Poyarkov, Boris Tereshchuk, Vladimir Ivanov, Ivan Bugaenkov, Georgi Mondzolevsky — Volleyball, Men's Team
Lyudmila Buldakova, Lyudmila Mikhailovskaya, Tatyana Veinberga, Vera Lantratova, Vera Galushka-Duyunova, Tatyana Sarycheva, Tatyana Ponyaeva-Tretyakova, Nina Smoleeva, Inna Ryskal, Galina Leontyeva, Roza Salikhova, Valentina Kamenek-Vinogradova — Volleyball, Women's Team
Leonid Zhabotinsky — Weightlifting, Men's Heavyweight
Viktor Kurentsov — Weightlifting, Men's Middleweight
Boris Selitsky — Weightlifting, Men's Light-heavyweight
Aleksandr Medved — Wrestling, Men's Freestyle Heavyweight
Boris Gurevich — Wrestling, Men's Freestyle Middleweight
Roman Rurua — Wrestling, Men's Greco-Roman Featherweight

Silver
Mikhail Voronin — Artistic Gymnastics, Men's Individual All-round
Zinaida Voronina — Artistic Gymnastics, Women's Individual All-round
Mikhail Voronin — Artistic Gymnastics, Men's Parallel Bars
Mikhail Voronin — Artistic Gymnastics, Men's Rings
Mikhail Voronin, Sergey Diomidov, Valery Ilyinykh, Valery Karasyov, Viktor Klimenko, Viktor Lisitsky — Artistic Gymnastics, Men's Team Competition
Romuald Klim — Athletics, Men's Hammer Throw
Antonina Okorokova-Lazareva — Athletics, Women's High Jump
Jonas Chepulis — Boxing, Men's Heavyweight
Aleksei Kiselyov — Boxing, Men's 71–75 kg
Aleksandr Sharapenko — Canoeing, Men's K-1 1000m
Natalya Lobanova — Diving, Women's 10m Platform
Tamara Pogozheva — Diving, Women's 3m Platform
Yelena Petushkova, Pepel, Ivan Kizimov, Ijor, Ivan Kalita, Absent — Equestrian, Team Mixed
Grigory Kriss — Fencing, Men's Épée Individual
Grigory Kriss, Iosif Vitebskiy, Aleksey Nikanchikov, Yury Smolyakov, Viktor Modzolevsky — Fencing, Men's Épée Team
German Sveshnikov, Yuri Sharov, Vasyl Stankovych, Viktor Putyatin, Yury Sisikin — Fencing, Men's Foil Team
Mark Rakita — Fencing, Men's Sabre Individual
Stasis Shaparnis, Boris Onishenko, Pavel Lednev — Modern Pentathlon, Men's Team Competition
Valentin Kornev — Shooting, Men's 300m Free Rifle 3 Positions
Vladimir Kosinsky — Swimming, Men's 100m Breaststroke
Vladimir Kosinsky — Swimming, Men's 200m Breaststroke
Georgi Kulikov, Viktor Mazanov, Semyon Belits-Geiman, Leonid Ilyichov — Swimming, Men's 4 × 100m Freestyle Relay
Galina Prozumenshchikova — Swimming, Women's 100m Breaststroke
Aleksey Barkalov, Aleksandr Dolgushin, Aleksandr Shidlovsky, Boris Grishin, Givi Chikvanaya, Leonid Osipov, Oleg Bovin, Vadim Gulyaev, Vladimir Semyonov, Vyacheslav Skok, Yury Grigorovsky — Men's Water polo
Dito Shanidze — Men's Weightlifting, Featherweight
Vladimir Belyaev — Men's Weightlifting, Light Heavyweight
Jaan Talts — Men's Weightlifting, Middle Heavyweight
Shota Lomidze — Men's Wrestling, Freestyle -97 kg
Vladimir Bakulin — Men's Wrestling, Greco-Roman -52 kg
Valentin Oleynik — Men's Wrestling, Greco-Roman -87 kg
Nikolai Yakovenko — Men's Wrestling, Greco-Roman -97 kg
Anatoly Roshchin — Men's Wrestling, Greco-Roman +97 kg

Bronze
Larisa Petrik — Artistic Gymnastics, Women's Balance Beam
Natalia Kuchinskaya — Artistic Gymnastics, Women's Floor Exercise
Natalia Kuchinskaya — Artistic Gymnastics, Women's Individual All-round
Viktor Klimenko — Artistic Gymnastics, Men's Parallel Bars
Mikhail Voronin — Artistic Gymnastics, Men's Pommel Horse
Zinaida Voronina — Artistic Gymnastics, Women's Uneven Bars
Sergei Diomidov — Artistic Gymnastics, Men's Vault
Zinaida Voronina — Artistic Gymnastics, Women's Vault
Nikolai Smaga — Athletics, Men's 20 km Walk
Natalya Pechenkina — Athletics, Women's 400m
Lyudmila Zharkova, Galina Bukharina, Vera Popkova, Lyudmila Samotyosova — Athletics, Women's 4 × 100 m Relay
Valentin Gavrilov — Athletics, Men's High Jump
Valentina Kozyr — Athletics, Women's High Jump
Tatyana Talysheva — Athletics, Women's Long Jump
Eduard Gushchin — Athletics, Men's Shot Put
Nadezhda Chizhova — Athletics, Women's Shot Put
Anatoli Krikun, Modestas Paulauskas, Zurab Sakandelidze, Vadim Kapranov, Yuri Selikhov, Anatoli Polivoda, Sergei Belov, Priit Tomson, Sergei Kovalenko, Gennadi Volnov, Jaak Lipso, Vladimir Andreyev — Basketball, Men's Team
Vladimir Musalimov — Boxing, Men's Welterweight
Vitaly Galkov — Canoeing, Men's C-1 1000m
Naum Prokupets, Mikhail Zamotin — Canoeing, Men's C-2 1000m
Lyudmila Pinayeva, Antonina Seredina — Canoeing, Women's K-2 500m
Pavel Lednyov — Modern Pentathlon, Men's Individual Competition
Zigmas Jukna, Antanas Bagdonavičius, Volodymyr Sterlik, Juozas Jagelavičius, Aleksandr Martyshkin, Vytautas Briedis, Valentyn Kravchuk, Viktor Suslin, Yuriy Lorentsson — Rowing, Men's Eight with Coxswain
Renart Suleimanov — Shooting, Men's 25m Rapid Fire Pistol
Vitaly Parkhimovich — Shooting, Men's 50m Rifle 3 Positions
Nikolai Pankin — Swimming, Men's 100m Breaststroke
Galina Prozumenschikova-Stepanova — Swimming, Women's 200m Breaststroke
Yuri Gromak, Vladimir Kosinsky, Vladimir Nemshilov, Leonid Ilyichev — Swimming, Men's 4 × 100 m Medley Relay
Vladimir Bure, Semyon Belits-Geiman, Georgi Kulikov, Leonid Ilyichev — Swimming, Men's 4 × 200 m Freestyle Relay
Ivan Kochergin — Wrestling, Men's Greco-Roman Bantamweight

Athletics

Basketball

Boxing

Canoeing

Cycling

Fifteen cyclists represented the Soviet Union in 1968.

Individual road race
 Valery Yardy
 Yury Dmitriyev
 Vladislav Nelyubin
 Anatoliy Starkov

Team time trial
 Boris Shukhov
 Aleksandr Dokhlyakov
 Yury Dmitriyev
 Valery Yardy

Sprint
 Omar Pkhak'adze
 Serhiy Kravtsov

1000m time trial
 Serhiy Kravtsov

Tandem
 Igor Tselovalnikov
 Imants Bodnieks

Team pursuit
 Dzintars Lācis
 Stanislav Moskvin
 Vladimir Kuznetsov
 Mikhail Kolyushev
 Viktor Bykov

Diving

Equestrian

Fencing

20 fencers, 15 men and 5 women, represented the Soviet Union in 1968.

Men's foil
 German Sveshnikov
 Vasyl Stankovych
 Viktor Putyatin

Men's team foil
 Yury Sisikin, Viktor Putyatin, German Sveshnikov, Yury Sharov, Vasyl Stankovych

Men's épée
 Grigory Kriss
 Viktor Modzalevsky
 Aleksey Nikanchikov

Men's team épée
 Grigory Kriss, Viktor Modzalevsky, Iosif Vitebsky, Aleksey Nikanchikov, Yury Smolyakov

Men's sabre
 Mark Rakita
 Vladimir Nazlymov
 Umyar Mavlikhanov

Men's team sabre
 Umyar Mavlikhanov, Mark Rakita, Viktor Sidyak, Vladimir Nazlymov, Eduard Vinokurov

Women's foil
 Yelena Novikova-Belova
 Galina Gorokhova
 Aleksandra Zabelina

Women's team foil
 Yelena Novikova-Belova, Galina Gorokhova, Aleksandra Zabelina, Tatyana Petrenko-Samusenko, Svetlana Tširkova

Gymnastics

Modern pentathlon

Three male pentathletes represented the Soviet Union in 1968. They won a team silver and Pavel Lednyov won an individual bronze.

Individual
 Pavel Lednyov
 Borys Onyshchenko
 Stasys Šaparnis

Team
 Pavel Lednyov
 Borys Onyshchenko
 Stasys Šaparnis

Rowing

The Soviet Union had 27 male rowers participate in all seven rowing events in 1968.

 Men's single sculls
 Viktor Melnikov (Виктор Мельников)

 Men's double sculls – 1st place ( gold medal)
 Anatoliy Sass (Анатолий Сасс)
 Aleksandr Timoshinin (Александр Тимошинин)

 Men's coxless pair
 Apolinaras Grigas (Аполинарас Григас)
 Vladimir Rikkanen (Владимир Рикканен)

 Men's coxed pair
 Leonid Drachevsky (Леонид Драчевский)
 Tiit Helmja (Тийт Хельмя)
 Igor Rudakov (Игорь Рудаков)

 Men's coxless four – 11th place
 Vitolds Barkāns (Витольдс Барканс)
 Elmārs Rubīns (Эльмар Рубинс)
 Pavel Ilyinsky (Павел Ильинский)
 Guntis Niedra (Гунтис Ниедра)

 Men's coxed four – 6th place
 Anatoly Nemtyryov (Анатолий Немтырёв)
 Nikolay Surov (Николай Суров)
 Aleksey Mishin (Алексей Мишин)
 Arkady Kudinov (Аркадий Кудинов) – competed in the semi-final only
 Boris Duyunov (Борис Дуюнов) – did not compete in the semi-final
 Viktor Mikheyev (Виктор Михеев) – cox

 Men's eight – 3rd place ( bronze medal)
 Zigmas Jukna (Зигмас Юкна)
 Antanas Bagdonavičius (Антанас Багдонавичюс)
 Volodymyr Sterlik (Володимир Стерлик)
 Juozas Jagelavičius (Йозас Ягелавичюс)
 Aleksandr Martyshkin (Александр Мартышкин)
 Vytautas Briedis (Витаутас Бриедис)
 Valentyn Kravchuk (Валентин Кравчук)
 Viktor Suslin (Виктор Суслин)
 Yuriy Lorentsson (Юрий Лоренцсон) – cox

Sailing

Shooting

Twelve shooters, all men, represented the Soviet Union in 1968. Between them they won two gold and two bronze medals.

25 m pistol
 Renart Suleymanov
 Anatoly Onishchuk

50 m pistol
 Grigory Kosykh
 Vladimir Stolypin

300 m rifle, three positions
 Valentin Kornev
 Shota Kveliashvili

50 m rifle, three positions
 Vitaly Parkhimovich
 Vladimir Konyakhin

50 m rifle, prone
 Valentin Kornev
 Vitaly Parkhimovich

Trap
 Pāvels Seničevs
 Aleksandr Alipov

Skeet
 Yevgeny Petrov
 Yury Tsuranov

Swimming

Volleyball

Men's Team Competition
Round Robin
 Lost to United States (2–3)
 Defeated Brazil (3–2)
 Defeated Bulgaria (3–0)
 Defeated Poland (3–0)
 Defeated East Germany (3–2)
 Defeated Japan (3–1)
 Defeated Mexico (3–1)
 Defeated Belgium (3–0)
 Defeated Czechoslovakia (3–0) →  Gold Medal

Team Roster
Eduard Sibiryakov
Valeri Kravchenko
Vladimir Belyayev
Yevgeni Lapinsky
Oleg Antropov
Vasilius Matushevas
Viktor Mikhalchuk
Yuri Poyarkov
Boris Tereshchuk
Vladimir Ivanov
Ivan Bugaenkov
Georgi Mondzolevsky

Women's Team Competition
Round Robin
 Defeated Czechoslovakia (3–1)
 Defeated Poland (3–0)
 Defeated South Korea (3–0)
 Defeated Peru (3–0)
 Defeated United States (3–1)
 Defeated Mexico (3–0)
 Defeated Japan (3–0) →  Gold Medal

Team Roster
Lyudmila Buldakova
Lyudmila Mikhailkovskaya
Tatyana Veinberga
Vera Lantratova
Vera Galushka-Duyunova
Tatyana Sarycheva
Tatyana Ponyaeva-Tretyakova
Nina Smoleeva
Inna Ryskal
Galina Leontyeva
Roza Salikhova
Valentina Kamenek-Vinogradova

Water polo

Men's Team Competition
Preliminary Round (Group A)
 Defeated Cuba (11:4)
 Defeated West Germany (6:3)
 Defeated Spain (5:0)
 Lost to Hungary (5:6)
 Defeated United States (8:3)
 Defeated Brazil (8:2)
Semifinals
 Defeated Italy (8:5)
Final
 Lost to Yugoslavia (11:13) →  Silver Medal

Team Roster
Aleksey Barkalov
Aleksandr Dolgushin
Aleksandr Shidlovsky
Boris Grishin
Givi Chikvanaya
Leonid Osipov
Oleg Bovin
Vadim Gulyaev
Vladimir Semyonov
Vyacheslav Skok
Yury Grigorovsky

Weightlifting

Wrestling

References

External links
Official Olympic Reports
International Olympic Committee results database

Nations at the 1968 Summer Olympics
1968
Summer Olympics